Alistair Applethwaite (born 1 September 1912, date of death unknown) was a Guyanese cricketer. He played in one first-class match for British Guiana in 1933/34.

See also
 List of Guyanese representative cricketers

References

External links
 

1912 births
Year of death missing
Guyanese cricketers
Guyana cricketers
People from Linden, Guyana